Artifodina is a genus of moths in the family Gracillariidae.

Species
Artifodina himalaica Kumata, 1985 
Artifodina japonica Kumata, 1985
Artifodina kurokoi Kumata, 1995
Artifodina siamensis Kumata, 1995
Artifodina strigulata Kumata, 1985

External links
Global Taxonomic Database of Gracillariidae (Lepidoptera)

Gracillariinae
Gracillarioidea genera